Krpan is a Croatian surname. Notable people with the surname include:

Vladimir Krpan (born 1938), Croatian classical pianist
Petar Krpan (born 1974), Croatian footballer

Fictional characters:
Martin Krpan, character in Slovenian folklore

Croatian surnames